The following is a list of notable people associated with Colorado College, located in the American city of Colorado Springs, Colorado.

Notable alumni

Arts

Film, theatre, and broadcasting
 Neal Baer, television producer/writer and pediatrician
 Dee Bradley Baker, voice actor
 Robert Bogue, actor 
 Ken Curtis, singer and actor best known for his role as Festus Haggen on the long-running CBS western television series Gunsmoke
 Jim Dziura, film director, cinematographer, and editor
 Daniel Junge, Academy Award-winning documentary filmmaker (Saving Face)
 Cynthia Lowen, documentary filmmaker (Bully)
 Peter Mortimer, Sports Emmy-winning filmmaker, co-founder of the REEL ROCK Film Tour
 Arden Myrin, comedian and actress
 Doug Pray, Emmy Award-winning film director (Art & Copy)
 Derek Richardson, actor
 Nick Rosen, filmmaker, co-creator of the Emmy-nominated National Geographic series, First Ascent
 Steve Sabol, film producer and former president of NFL Films
 Aaron Shure, Emmy Award-winning television writer, director, and producer (Everybody Loves Raymond, The Office)
 Marc Webb, producer and director of music videos and films such as (500) Days of Summer and The Amazing Spider-Man
 Dean Winters, actor

Writers, journalists and publishers
 William Brangham, American journalist  currently a correspondent for the PBS NewsHour
 David Burnett, photojournalist recognized for the World Press Photo of the Year (1980), co-recipient of the Robert Capa Gold Medal, and named Magazine Photographer of the Year by the National Press Photographers Association
 Michael Dahlie, novelist
 Gregg Easterbrook, writer and contributing editor of The New Republic and The Atlantic Monthly
 Frieda Ekotto, francophone African woman novelist and literary critic
 Thomas Hornsby Ferril, poet laureate of Colorado
 Mark Fiore, Pulitzer Prize-winning political cartoonist
 Edward K. Gaylord, publisher of the Daily Oklahoman
 Kaui Hart Hemmings, novelist, author of The Descendants and House of Thieves
 Mabel Barbee Lee, writer
 Reginald McKnight, short story writer and novelist, recipient of the O. Henry Award, the Drue Heinz Literature Prize, and the Whiting Award
 Michael Nava, attorney and writer

Artists and musicians
 Herbert Beattie, operatic bass and voice teacher
 Eric Bransby, muralist
 Cecil Effinger, composer, oboist, and inventor
 Jo Estill, singer, singing voice specialist and voice researcher
 Glenna Goodacre, sculptor
 Margaret Kilgallen, Mission School artist and printmaker
 Janet Maguire, composer
 Duard Marshall, painter
 Max Morath, ragtime pianist, composer, actor and author
 Ann Royer, painter, sculptor
 Abigail Washburn, Grammy Award-winning banjo player and singer
Jeremy Zucker, singer-songwriter

Economics and business
Obadiah J. Barker, founder and president of Barker Brothers
 Charles Cicchetti, co-founder Madison Consulting Group, Professor of Economics at the University of Southern California
 Harold Thayer Davis, mathematician, statistician, and econometrician, known for the Davis distribution
 Alexander Ellis III, partner in the venture-capital firm Rockport Capital Partners
 Joe Ellis, President of the Denver Broncos
 Lori Garver, General Manager of the Air Line Pilots Association
 James Heckman, winner of 2000 Nobel Prize for Economics, Henry Schultz Distinguished Service Professor of Economics at the University of Chicago, Professor of Law at the Law School, and director of the Center for the Economics of Human Development
 David Malpass, President of the World Bank
 Sebastian Suhl, former COO of Prada S.p.A.; CEO at Givenchy
 Amy Tucker, inventor of Xeko

Government and politics
 Patty Pansing Brooks, Nebraska State Senator
 Elizabeth Cheney, U.S. Representative for Wyoming, daughter of former Vice President Dick Cheney and Second Lady Lynne Cheney
 Lynne Cheney, former Second Lady of the United States, wife of former Vice President Dick Cheney, novelist, conservative scholar, and former talk-show host
 Mary Cheney, former campaign aide, daughter of former Vice President Dick Cheney and Second Lady Lynne Cheney
 Matt Claman, member of the Alaska House of Representatives
 Marian W. Clarke, former U.S. Representative for New York's 34th District
 Diana DeGette, U.S. Representative from Colorado's 1st Congressional District, attorney
 Myron Ebell, Director of Global Warming and International Environmental Policy at the Competitive Enterprise Institute
 Randall Edwards, former Oregon State Treasurer
 Lori Garver, former Deputy Administrator of NASA
 Abdul Aziz Abdul Ghani, former Prime Minister of Yemen
 Harrison Loesch, former Assistant Secretary of Interior
 Katherine Maraman, former chief justice of the Supreme Court of Guam
 Helen Stevenson Meyner, former U.S. Representative for New Jersey's 13th District
 Ted Morton, former Minister of Energy for Alberta, former Minister of Finance and Enterprise for Alberta, former Minister of Sustainable Resource Development for Alberta, Former member of the Legislative Assembly of Alberta 
 Mark Norris, Judge of the United States District Court for the Western District of Tennessee, former Majority Leader of the Tennessee Senate, former Tennessee State Senator
 Philip Perry, former acting associate attorney general at Department of Justice, former general counsel of Office of Management and Budget, and former general counsel of Department of Homeland Security
 Frederick Madison Roberts, great-grandson of Sally Hemings, former member of the California State Assembly, first African American elected to public office on the West Coast
 Gregor Robertson, former Mayor of Vancouver, former member of the Legislative Assembly of British Columbia
 Ken Salazar, United States Ambassador to Mexico, former United States Secretary of the Interior, former United States senator, former Attorney General of Colorado, former Executive Director of the Colorado Department of Natural Resources
 Harry H. Seldomridge, former U.S. Representative from Colorado's 2nd District
 Joe Simitian, Member of the Santa Clara County Board of Supervisors, former California State Senator, former member of the California State Assembly, former member of the Palo Alto City Council
 Colin M. Simpson, former House Speaker of the Wyoming House of Representatives, former member of the Wyoming House of Representatives
 Richard H. Stallings, former Chair of the Idaho Democratic Party, former United States Nuclear Waste Negotiator, former U.S. Representative from Idaho's 2nd District
 Stuart Stevens, strategist for Mitt Romney's 2012 presidential campaign, cofounder of Washington, D.C. - based political media consultancy Stevens & Schriefer Group
 Timothy Tymkovich, Chief Judge of the United States Court of Appeals for the Tenth Circuit

Academia
 William Drea Adams, former President, Colby College and Bucknell University
 Anne Basting, winner of 2016 MacArthur Fellowship, Professor of Theater at the University of Wisconsin-Milwaukee
 Charles L. Briggs, Alan Dundes Distinguished Professor of Folklore at the University of California, Berkeley
 Harold Thayer Davis, Professor of Mathematics at Northwestern University
 Frieda Ekotto, Professor of French, Comparative Literature, Afroamerican and African Studies at the University of Michigan
 Brian J. Enquist, Professor of Biology at the University of Arizona
 Paul Franco, Barry N. Wish Professor of Government and Social Studies at Bowdoin College
 Donna Haraway, Professor of Science and Technology Studies in the History of Consciousness Department and the Feminist Studies Department at the University of California, Santa Cruz
 James Heckman, winner of 2000 Nobel Prize for Economics, Henry Schultz Distinguished Service Professor of Economics at the University of Chicago and director of the Center for the Economics of Human Development
 Huntington D. Lambert, dean of the Division of Continuing Education and University Extension at Harvard University
 Liang Shih-chiu, academic single-handedly responsible for translating the works of William Shakespeare into Chinese
 Margaret A. Liu, Professor of Microbiology and Immunology and the University of California, San Francisco
 Reginald McKnight, Hamilton Holmes Professor of English at the University of Georgia
 Ted Morton, Professor of Political Science at the University of Calgary
 John Novembre, winner of 2015 MacArthur Fellowship, Professor of Computational Biology at the University of Chicago
 Andrew Spielman, Professor of Tropical Public Health at the Harvard School of Public Health
 Pauline Turner Strong, director of the Humanities Institute at the University of Texas at Austin
 Elmo Scott Watson, Professor of Journalism at Northwestern University
 Terry Winograd, Professor of Computer Science at Stanford University and co-director of the Stanford Human-Computer Interaction Group

Science
Sarah Andrews, geologist and author
Brian J. Enquist, Biologist and Ecologist
 Richard Green, chairman of the Space Sciences Institute, previously served as President and CEO of CableLabs
 Myra Keen, malacologist and invertebrate paleontologist
 Frank Leverett, geologist who specialised in glaciology
 Margaret A. Liu, founder and leader in DNA vaccination, named one of the 50 most important women in science by Discover magazine
 Jane Lubchenco, marine ecologist and environmental scientist, former NOAA Administrator
 Marcia McNutt, ForMemRS, is an American geophysicist and the 22nd president of the National Academy of Sciences of the United States (NAS). She is the former editor-in-chief of Science, the 15th director of the United States Geological Survey (USGS) (and first woman to hold the post), and science adviser to the United States Secretary of the Interior.
 Kenneth N. Ogle, scientist of human vision
 Andrew Spielman, public health entomologist
 G. Harry Stine, founding figure of model rocketry, science and technology writer
 William A. Welch, engineer and environmentalist

Military
 Austin R. Brunelli, Brigadier general in the Marine Corps, World War II Navy Cross recipient
 Marcellus H. Chiles, World War I Medal of Honor recipient
 Hildreth Frost, Captain in Colorado National Guard, lawyer during Colorado Coalfield War trials
 Bert Stiles, World War II fighter pilot awarded the Distinguished Flying Cross and the Air Medal
 Robert M. Stillman, Major General in the United States Air Force

Athletics

Olympics
As of the 2018 Winter Olympics, 21 Colorado College students have competed in the Olympic Games, claiming a total of seven medals (three golds, two silvers, two bronzes).

 Isabel Atkin, 2018 Olympic bronze medalist in women's slopestyle
 Trevor Barron, race walker who competed at the 2012 Summer Olympics
 Scott Driggers, handballer, 1988 Summer Olympics
 Alison Dunlap, professional cyclist, former Olympian
 Peggy Fleming, 1968 Olympic gold medalist in figure skating, three-time world champion figure skater (1966-1968)
 Martina Franko, Canada Women's Soccer Team, 2008 Summer Olympics
 Christine Haigler, U.S. figure skater 1964 Winter Olympics
 David Jenkins, 1960 Olympic gold medalist in men's figure skating, three-time world champion (1957-1959)
 Hayes Alan Jenkins, gold medalist in men's figure skating, 1956 Winter Olympics, four-time world champion figure skater (1953-1956)
 Tara Nott, gold medalist in women's weight lifting, 2000 Olympics
 Eliza Outtrim, U.S. Freestyle Skiing team, 2014 Winter Olympics
 Hillary Wolf, U.S. Judo Team, 1996 Summer Olympics and 2000 Summer Olympics

Football
 Dutch Clark, Pro Football Hall of Fame player and coach
 John Gagliardi, former football coach, College Football Hall of Fame inductee
 Douglas Mitchell, Canadian Football League player and commissioner
 Ed Smith, former defensive end for the Denver Broncos

Hockey
Over 170 Colorado College alumni have gone on to play professionally, including over 30 current and former NHL players. In addition, nine Colorado College alumni have represented their country in hockey at the Olympics.

 Ryan Bach, NHL goaltender
 Richard Bachman, NHL player
 Art Berglund, ice hockey coach and executive, Lester Patrick Trophy award winner
Rick Boh
Colin Chisholm
 Brian Connelly, American Hockey League defenseman
Joey Crabb, NHL winger, Florida Panthers
 Dave Feamster
Bill Hay, former Chicago Blackhawks centre
 Jack Hillen, NHL ice hockey defenceman, Nashville Predators
Doug Lidster, NHL defencemen, member of Team Canada at the 1984 Winter Olympics
Curtis McElhinney
Doug Palazzari, United States Hockey Hall of Fame inductee
Toby Petersen, right winger, Dallas Stars
 Tom Preissing, NHL player, Hobey Baker Award finalist
 Nate Prosser
 Jaden Schwartz, NHL St. Louis Blues forward, Captain Team Canada World Junior 2012
 Peter Sejna, NHL ice hockey center, 2003 Men's World Ice Hockey Championships bronze medalist, Hobey Baker Award winner
 Marty Sertich, AHL ice hockey center, Hobey Baker Award winner
 Brett Sterling, NHL ice hockey player
 Colin Stuart
 Mark Stuart
 Mike Stuart, alternate captain, Winnipeg Jets
 Brian Swanson
 Lee Sweatt

Other

 Carol Rymer Davis, 2004 Gordon Bennet Cup winner
 Anton Krupicka, ultra-runner, two-time Leadville 100 winner
 Hilaree Nelson, ski mountaineer, first woman to summit two 8,000-meter peaks in a 24-hour period
Abbie Richards, TikToker
 Bert Stiles, pilot and author
 Jerry Wainwright, former Director of Basketball Operations for the Marquette Golden Eagles
 Al Walker (born 1959), former basketball player and college coach, now a scout for the Detroit Pistons of the NBA
 Lukas Walton, heir to the Walton family and grandson of Walmart founder Sam Walton.
 Renan Öztürk, rock climber and mountaineer.

Presidents of Colorado College
Colorado College has had about 16 presidents and acting presidents since its founding:
 Rev. Jonathan Edward, 1874-1875
 Rev. James G. Dougherty, 1875-1876
 Edward P. Tenney, 1876-1884
 William F. Slocum, Jr., 1888-1917
 Clyde A. Duniway, 1917-1924
 Charles Christopher Mierow - 1923-24 (acting) and 1925-1934
 Charles Brown Hershey, 1933-1934 (acting) and 1943-1945 (acting)
 Thurston J. Davies, 1934-1948
 William H. Gill, 1949-1955
 Louis T. Benezet, 1955-1963
 Lloyd E. Worner, 1963-1981
 Thomas Cronin, 1991 (acting)
 Gresham Riley, 1981-1992
 Michael Grace, 1992-1993 (acting)
 Kathryn Mohrman, 1993-2002
 Richard F. Celeste, 2002-2011
 Jill Tiefenthaler, 2011-2020
 Mike Edmonds and Robert Moore 2020-2021 (acting)
 Song Richardson 2021–present

Professors
 Ofer Ben-Amots, Israeli-American classical composer
 Florian Cajori, Swiss-American historian of mathematics
 Thomas Cronin, political scientist and author
 Edward Diller, German literary scholar and author
 Idris Goodwin, playwright, hip hop artist, educator, and co-creator/co-host of serial radio broadcasts
 J. Glenn Gray, philosopher, author and translator
 Steven Hayward, Canadian author and co-creator/co-host of serial radio broadcasts
 Anne F. Hyde, historian, author, 2012 Bancroft Prize winner, 2012 Pulitzer Prize finalist
 Dan Johnson, microeconomist and entrepreneur
 David Mason, poet
 Jim Parco, author, businessman, and retired Air Force Lieutenant Colonel
 Andrew Price-Smith, political scientist, author on health security, environmental security, pandemic influenza
 Stephen Scott, neo-classical composer
 Dennis Showalter, military historian
 Christine Siddoway, geologist, Antarctica researcher

References

Colorado College people